Haven Bruce (born January 12, 1979 in Charlotte, North Carolina) is an American soccer striker who currently plays for Upward Stars FC in the National Premier Soccer League. He started his career with the Wilmington Hammerheads before moving to Costa Rica to play for Asociacion Deportiva San Carlos. Bruce returned to the US in 2005 and subsequently had spells with the Greenville Lions and the Harrisburg City Islanders before joining Performance FC in 2008. During his time with Performance, he had a trial with the Atlanta Silverbacks. After stepping away from playing to focus on coaching and family, Bruce signed with Upward Stars FC in early 2015.

References
General
Haven Bruce profile at Harrisburg City Islanders official website

Specific

1979 births
Living people
American expatriate soccer players
Wilmington Hammerheads FC players
Greenville Lions players
Penn FC players
USL Second Division players
Soccer players from South Carolina
American expatriate sportspeople in Costa Rica
American soccer players
Association football forwards